Chester Gan (1908-1959) was an American character actor of Chinese descent who worked in Hollywood from the 1930s through the 1950s.

Biography 
Chester Gan was born in Grass Valley, California, to Wing Hong Gan and Wong Shee. He went to China for university, where he developed an interest in acting. Upon his return to the United States, he headed to Los Angeles, where he worked as an engineer.

In 1932, Gan's acting career in Hollywood began as a Chinese guard in Secrets of the French Police. Gan played almost a hundred roles, typically portraying Asian stereotypes, from the Chinese cook or waiter to the Japanese enemy soldier. (He once joked that as an actor, he was responsible for hundreds of on-screen deaths.) He also worked as an interpreter and a consultant on Chinese culture and customs on Hollywood films like The Good Earth.

Aside from his acting career, owned a slipper store and a restaurant in Los Angeles's Chinatown neighborhood. World War II put a pause on his career as an actor, as he joined the navy. He died in San Francisco—where he operated a photography business—in 1959 after a brief illness. He was survived by his wife, his four children, and his father.

Selected filmography

References

External links

 
 Asian-American Cinema Part II the 1930s at Amoeba.com (with images)

1908 births
1959 deaths
American male film actors
American male actors of Chinese descent
20th-century American male actors
Male actors from San Francisco
People from Grass Valley, California